Aztec architecture is a late form of Mesoamerican architecture developed by the Aztec civilization. Much of what is known about this style of architecture comes from the structures that are still standing. These structures have survived for several centuries because of the strong materials used and the skill of the builders. Most civic architecture was concentrated in the center of Aztec cities. However, many cities had smaller supplemental ceremonial areas.

Influences 
Aztec architecture reflects the migration of the Aztec culture across present-day Mexico. The style of early Aztec pyramids was influenced by those of Classic and other Postclassic Mesoamerican societies. Aztec architecture subsequently influenced later Mesoamerican styles. As Manuel Aguilar-Moreno writes, "Aztec architecture was heavily influenced by the Toltec of Colhuacan, the Tepanec of Atzcapotzalco, and the Acolhua of Tetzcoco". It is important to note that since the Aztec Empire was largely built through conquest, the Aztecs had the challenge of incorporating the ethnic groups of the regions they conquered into one unified empire. By having a distinct architectural style, the Aztec Empire was able to promote its worldview and showcase the power of the Empire's military.

The ancient Aztecs focused on cosmology, astronomy, and religion as their main sources of inspiration. Aztec religious beliefs are reflected in the designs of the religious structures as well as domestic structures. Research into the significance of building alignment in Aztec culture has shown that the dates of sunrises and sunsets along architectural orientation exhibit a pattern of separated intervals that are largely multiples of 13 and 20 days. This detail suggests to experts that the orientation of these structures was related to the Mesoamerican calendrical system. It has also been discovered that the dates that occur most frequently in these orientations align with important days in the ritual agricultural cycle of the Aztecs.

History 
Some of the most well-known architecture of the Aztec Empire was located in the capital city Tenochtitlan, which was destroyed after the Spanish conquest in the 16th century. Materials taken from the city were then used in the construction of Mexico City. Because of the construction of Mexico City, not much archaeological evidence remains at important Aztec sites such as the Aztec Temple Square.

Aztec architectural sites include Malinalco, Tenayuca, conquered by the Aztec circa 1434. This site is the earliest known example of the typical Aztec double pyramid—joined pyramidal bases supporting two temples—and the Templo Mayor, the biggest building in the Aztec city Tenochtitlan.

Style 
Aztec architecture is characterized by symmetry and elements like geometric designs and sweeping lines. Other key stylistic traits include the use of "bas-reliefs, walls, plazas, and platforms as media to represent their gods and ideals," according to Manuel Aguilar-Moreno.

There are also many symbolic elements inherent in Aztec architecture, including the four cardinal directions, which each represents a deity, color, and symbol. Animal symbols were also utilized in the architectural style of the Aztecs: eagles represent the sun and warriors, serpents represented water or fire, and conch shells symbolized fertility. The temples themselves represented mountains, Aztec symbols for water and fertility. The architecture, particularly the sculptures on and in the temples, were symbolically painted. Each cardinal direction was represented by a color and ruled by a religious figure, details which were incorporated into Aztec architecture on many occasions. The north was believed to be ruled by the god Tezcatlipoca, the god of the night. The north was represented by the color black. The south was said to be ruled by Huitzilopochtli, the god of the sun and warfare, and characterized by the color blue.

Types of structures 
The structures in the city of Tenochtitlan included temples, palaces, and platforms. The temples were terraced pyramids with steep stairs leading up to the main temple. Domestic structures reflected the social and financial status of inhabitants.

Elites lived in palaces, which were called tecpans. The word tecpan is often used as a shorthand for many different types of palaces, regardless of any special functions individual structures may have had. "Most commonly, the term [tecpan] meant the home of a hereditary lord, and it also took on associated meanings, such as seat of government, place of riches and art, and idyllic retreat amidst scenery and diversions".

Aztec palaces consisted of three main types: Administrative palaces, mansions of wealthy nobles, and pleasure palaces and retreats. Administrative palaces served as the location for local government, as well as the residences of local rulers. The focal point of these structures was a large courtyard near the entrance of the building, surrounded by suites that served various purposes. "The form of the tecpan is dominated by a large courtyard, opening onto the community plaza, which is best seen as a kind of mega-courtyard for the community," according to Susan Evans. The mansions of wealthy nobles were used solely as residences, and were constructed in accordance with Aztec sumptuary laws. Pleasure palaces and retreats served many purposes, ranging from add-on structures at religious shrines to more opulent structures, such as Nezahualcoyotl's baths, located at Texcotzingo.

Unfortunately, experts only have substantial evidence for a few dozen tecpans, out of the hundreds that once stood throughout the Aztec Empire. Most of these confirmed finds are administrative tecpans.

Pyramid-temples, or teocalli, were religious buildings whose construction was sponsored by the government to emphasize the religious significance of the area, as well as its imperial might. According to Gary Feinman, Mesoamerican temples were typically rectangular structures with one entrance, located on one of its long sides. The structure of the temple was generally an elevated or shortened pyramid mound. They often consisted of two or more rooms, with an outer and inner chamber, the inner chamber being seen as more sacred.

While rectangular pyramids could be dedicated to a wide range of gods, circular pyramids could only be dedicated to one god, Ehecatl, who represented wind in Aztec culture.

Urban designers in the Aztec period were known for placing small altars in significant locations. Some of these altars were believed to be bases for skull racks used to display victims of sacrifice. Others may have been dedicated to female fertility and curing, areas commonly associated with the tzitzimitl deities in Aztec culture. Still others may have served as offerings to the god Tezcatlipoca.

Houses were uniform throughout most of the empire, only varying in size and ornamentation.

The Aztecs built causeways and chinampas in Tenochtitlan due to its location in the Mexico City basin.

Building techniques 
The Aztecs had advanced knowledge of building techniques, and they knew how to adapt their techniques to the local geology and terrain of an area, particularly the soft soil. The builders traditionally constructed stone bases for the temples. J. A. Joyce writes that "[t]he physical geography of Central America was favorable to the rise of the art of building in stone." Some structures, such as the Templo Mayor of Tenochtitlan were constructed on top of many hundreds of support piles to help stabilize the building in the marshy terrain surrounding Tenochtitlan.

The Aztecs were also known to use gravity to create a running water system, bringing fresh water to the city grid. They also employed terracing to enhance agricultural productivity.

Instead of demolishing old temples and building a new one at the same site, the Aztecs sometimes built over the existing structures, which resulted in larger and more detailed pyramids. Some temples have been found to have at least four or five layers.

Relationship with Aztec culture 
The Aztecs designed their buildings to be functional for everyday life as well as religious practices. The architectural style of the Aztecs reflected relationships with a higher power. In Tenochtitlan, the layout of the city represented the birth of Huitzilopochtli, the Aztec god of the sun and war.

The teocalli, or pyramid-temples, were significant to Aztec religious practices. They were the sites of religious celebrations and rituals. The temples represented ascension. There were multiple torn levels, which each correlated with different classes. The Aztecs believed that ascension was the process of preparing oneself to please the gods. At the top was the main temple where sacrifices took place, since that was considered to be closest to the gods.

Aztec households were simple and uniform to the rest of the civilization. Houses could be one to two stories tall.

Separation of classes 
Aztec culture had class stratification. The highest social rank was that of the priesthood, which permitted access to the temples and more exclusive quarters. Members of the priesthood lived near the temples in the central areas of the city, while people of lower classes lived increasingly further away according to their status. The sizes of domestic structures reflected differences in wealth, power, and status.

References

Further reading

External links 

 Aztec Architecture from the Think Quest Library
 Aztec Architecture from the University of Redlands

Architectural styles
Architecture in Mexico
Aztec
Mesoamerican architecture